Steven Rogers is an American screenwriter. He is best known for writing and producing the 2017 dark comedy I, Tonya, and for writing the romantic comedies Kate & Leopold and Hope Floats. He created the 2022 miniseries Mike about the life of boxer Mike Tyson.

Background and education

Rogers was born in  Seattle, Washington. He is a graduate of Sanford Meisner’s Neighborhood Playhouse, in New York City.

Career

Rogers has written the screenplays for a number of films, including Hope Floats (1998), Stepmom (1998), Kate & Leopold (2001), P.S. I Love You (2007), and Love the Coopers (2015).

In 2017, he wrote and produced a biographical dark comedy about Tonya Harding titled I, Tonya. It stars Margot Robbie, Sebastian Stan, and Allison Janney and was directed by Craig Gillespie. For his script, Rogers earned nominations for the BAFTA Award for Best Original Screenplay and Writers Guild of America Award for Best Original Screenplay.

References

External links
L. A. Times Profile, Steven Rogers
Business Insider In-Depth: Steven Rogers and I, Tonya
Austin American-Statesman: In-Depth, Steven Rogers and I, Tonya
 

Living people
20th-century American male writers
20th-century American screenwriters
21st-century American male writers
21st-century American screenwriters
American male screenwriters
Neighborhood Playhouse School of the Theatre alumni
Screenwriters from Washington (state)
Writers from Seattle
Year of birth missing (living people)